The Witches of Eastwick is a 1987 American dark fantasy-comedy film directed by George Miller and starring Jack Nicholson as Daryl Van Horne, alongside Cher, Michelle Pfeiffer and Susan Sarandon as the titular witches. The film is based on John Updike's 1984 novel of the same name, telling the story of three women who are unaware of the power of the words they speak; as they tell each other their deepest desires, a man arrives just in time and fulfills them, but has a dark side of his own.

Plot

Alexandra Medford, Jane Spofford, and Sukie Ridgemont are three dissatisfied women living in picturesque Eastwick, Rhode Island. Sculptor Alex is a single mother of one, newly divorced music teacher Jane can't have children, and Sukie has six and is a columnist for the newspaper Eastwick Word. The friends lost their husbands (Alex's died, Jane's divorced her, and Sukie's abandoned her). Unaware of being witches, they unwittingly form a coven, meeting weekly to discuss ideal men.

A mysterious man buys the town's landmark property, the Lenox Mansion. His arrival fascinates everyone except Felicia Alden, the devoutly religious wife of newspaper editor Clyde Alden, Sukie's boss. She senses he (whose name is easily forgotten) is ill-intentioned.

One night, at Jane's recital he appears and makes a spectacle, leading to more gossip. Receiving flowers from D sparks Sukie to remember his name is Daryl Van Horne. Chaos over the name spreads through the crowd. Sukie's pearl necklace suddenly breaks, the beads falling all over the floor, causing Felicia (who had mocked his name) to fall down stairs, breaking her leg.

The next day, Daryl seduces Alex. He says insensitive, disgusting, and rude things whenever he speaks. Appalled, she tells him off, refuses his advances and begins to walk out. Before she opens the door, he manipulates her emotions until she eventually agrees. The next morning, Daryl visits the shy and insecure Jane. They sit and politely converse, as she explains the Lenox Mansion was built on a site where witches were executed. Later that night, Daryl encourages Jane to play her cello with wild abandon, playing increasingly fast while accompanied by him on piano, until the strings emit smoke, the cello catches fire, and Jane passionately flings herself upon him.

The following week, Daryl invites all three over, now seeking Sukie. Envy and rivalry emerge among them, they inadvertently levitate a tennis ball. Now aware of their magical abilities, the women agree to share Daryl. As the women spend more time at Daryl's mansion, Felicia spreads rumors about their indecency, turning the trio into social outcasts. As the witches begin to question their loyalty to Daryl, he causes them to unknowingly cast a spell against Felicia. Later that night, while ranting to her husband about Daryl being the Devil, she begins to vomit cherry pits. Horrified by her uncontrollable behavior, Clyde kills her with a fire poker.

After Felicia's death, the trio, fearing their powers, agree to avoid each other and Daryl until the situation stabilizes. Upset at being abandoned, he awakens their worst fears. Alex thinks she's covered with snakes; Jane rapidly ages; and Sukie has sudden, agonizing pain. Realizing they can only remove Daryl through witchcraft, they reunite with him, pretending to make amends. They all also discover they are pregnant.

The next morning, the trio send Daryl on an errand while Alex uses wax and his hair to create a voodoo doll of him that they harm, hoping he will leave. As the spell takes effect, Daryl – still in town – is hit by a sudden wind and begins to feel excruciating pain (each event corresponding to something the women do to the doll). He hides inside a church from the wind and finds it full of worshippers. Realizing the source of his troubles, he rants about the women, cursing them as a group before vomiting cherry pits as Felicia did. Enraged, Daryl races home to punish the witches for their betrayal. Unsure if the voodoo has affected him, they attempt to behave normally, only to be shocked when he enters the mansion disheveled, incoherent, and seeking revenge.

In the ensuing chaos, the doll breaks into pieces. This causes Daryl to transform to a large, monstrous form that attempts to shake the mansion apart and starts a fire. The witches then toss it into the fire, causing Daryl to change into a shriveled homunculus and vanish.

Eighteen months later, the women are living together in Daryl's mansion, each with a new baby son (each shares his mother's hair color). The boys are playing together when Daryl appears on a wall filled with video screens, inviting them to "give Daddy a kiss". Before they can, the ladies appear and switch off the televisions, to his chagrin.

Cast
 Jack Nicholson as Daryl Van Horne
 Cher as Alexandra Medford
 Susan Sarandon as Jane Spofford
 Michelle Pfeiffer as Sukie Ridgemont
 Veronica Cartwright as Felicia Alden
 Richard Jenkins as Clyde Alden
 Keith Jochim as Walter Neff
 Becca Lish as Mrs. Neff
 Carel Struycken as Fidel

Differences from novel
While the film follows the basic structure of the novel, several major developments are dropped, with the book being darker in tone. The setting of both is Rhode Island, but the novel sets the time during the early 1970s. In the novel, Daryl is more devil-like: less of an enabler and more of a selfish, perverse predator and architect of mayhem. Also, the film omits a key episode in the book, where Daryl unexpectedly marries a young, innocent girl named Jenny, and the jealous three witches magically cause her to die of cancer. None of the three witches gets pregnant and at the end Daryl flees town with Jenny's younger brother, Chris, apparently his lover. Also in the book Alexandra's last name was Spofford, not Medford and Jane was Jane Smart, not Jane Spofford, and Sukie was Rougemont not Ridgemont. There are differences in their hair and build too; Alexandra is plump and Sukie is the redhead.

Production

Casting
Jack Nicholson expressed interest in playing the role of Daryl through his then-girlfriend Anjelica Huston, after hearing that the original actor for the role, Bill Murray, had dropped out. Huston was in the running for the role of Alexandra Medford, and screen-tested opposite Michelle Pfeiffer, who had already been cast as Sukie, and Amy Madigan, who was being considered for the role of Jane. After giving a self-confessed "terrible" audition in which she struggled with the "tough" dialogue, Huston realized she had lost the role, and it would be eventually acquired by Cher; but Cher insisted on playing the part of Alexandra, which had already been given to Susan Sarandon. Producers gave in to Cher’s demands and cast her in the role instead, without ever giving Sarandon proper notice of the revision. She did not find out that her role had been given to Cher, and that she herself had been re-cast as Jane, until the day she turned up on location to start filming.

Filming
The Witches of Eastwick was originally set to be filmed in Little Compton, Rhode Island but controversy erupted in Little Compton over whether or not its Congregational church should be involved with the film's production. Warner Bros. instead turned to locations in Massachusetts. Principal photography began on July 14, 1986, and took place over the course of six weeks in Cohasset and nearby Massachusetts towns, such as Marblehead and Scituate. Castle Hill in Ipswich, Massachusetts, was used for the exterior of the Lenox Mansion, while the lobby of the Wang Theatre in Boston stood in for the main hall. Other interiors were filmed at the Greystone Mansion in Beverly Hills, though the swimming pool and Daryl's library were sets built on the Warner Bros. backlot.

Prior to filming, a small carving shop led by woodcarver Paul McCarthy was commissioned to hand-carve all the wooden signs for the businesses shown in the movie, including the newspaper where Michelle Pfeiffer's character worked – The Eastwick Word.

Music
The musical score for The Witches of Eastwick was composed and conducted by John Williams. A soundtrack album was released by Warner Bros. Records in 1987.

Reception

Critical response
On Rotten Tomatoes the film has a rating of 66% based on 92 reviews. The site's consensus states: "While devotees of John Updike’s novel may want to put a hex on George Miller’s cartoonish and effects-laden adaptation, Jack Nicholson lends enough decadent devilry to make this high-concept comedy sizzle." On Metacritic, the film has a score of 67 out of 100 rating based on reviews from 11 critics, indicating "generally favorable reviews". Audiences polled by CinemaScore gave the film an average grade of "B+" on an A+ to F scale.

The Washington Post wrote that "Hollywood pulls out all the stops here, including a reordering of John Updike's original book to give you one flashy and chock-full-o'-surprises witches' tale." Janet Maslin in The New York Times commended the "bright, flashy, exclamatory style." Variety described it as a "very funny and irresistible set-up."

Some critics thought that the last part of the film spiraled into ridiculousness. The Washington Post wrote that the second half "lost its magic and degenerated into bunk." According to The New York Times, "beneath the surface charm there is too much confusion, and the charm itself is gone long before the film is over." Time Out wrote that "the last 20 minutes dive straight to the bottom of the proverbial barrel with a final crass orgy of special effects." Roger Ebert in the Chicago Sun-Times gave the film three-and-a-half stars out of four, acknowledging that "the movie's climax is overdone" yet added that "a lot of the time this movie plays like a plausible story about implausible people."

The majority of critics saw the film as a showcase for Nicholson's comic talents. The Chicago Sun-Times thought it "a role he was born to fill... There is a scene where he dresses in satin pajamas and sprawls full length on a bed, twisting and stretching sinuously in full enjoyment of his sensuality. It is one of the funniest moments of physical humor he has ever committed." The New York Times wrote that although "the performers are eminently watchable... none of them seem a match for Mr. Nicholson's self-proclaimed 'horny little devil'." Variety called it a "no-holds-barred performance," and wrote that the "spectacle of the film is really Nicholson." The Washington Post wrote that Nicholson was "undisputably the star of The Witches of Eastwick, despite formidable competition from his coven played by Cher, Michelle Pfeiffer, and Susan Sarandon," although even more praise was reserved for Veronica Cartwright in an eccentric, scene-stealing supporting role.

Ruth Crawford wrote: "This film includes many fantasy elements. By far the most fantastic of them is the depiction of a single mother of five, who has to work for a living and still has plenty of time and energy left to engage in wild adventures of sex and magic. If being a witch gives you the ability to do that, quite a few women I know would be very happy to sign up at the nearest coven."

Accolades
The film was nominated for two Academy Awards in the categories of Best Original Score (for John Williams' music) and Best Sound, losing both to The Last Emperor. The film did win a BAFTA Award in the category of Best Special Effects, and received a nomination for the Hugo Award for Best Dramatic Presentation. Williams was also nominated for a Grammy Award for Best Album of Original Instrumental Background Score Written for a Motion Picture or Television, and won a BMI Film Music Award.

Jack Nicholson won a Saturn Award for Best Actor, and the film received nominations in a further six categories: Best Fantasy Film, Best Actress (Susan Sarandon), Best Supporting Actress (Veronica Cartwright), Best Writing (Michael Cristofer), Best Music (John Williams), and Best Special Effects.

Jack Nicholson also won Best Actor awards from the New York Film Critics Circle (for his work in Witches, Ironweed and Broadcast News) and the Los Angeles Film Critics Association (for Witches and Ironweed), the latter shared with Steve Martin for Roxanne (1987).

References

External links

 
 
 
 

The Witches of Eastwick
1987 films
1987 horror films
1980s buddy comedy-drama films
1980s comedy horror films
1980s fantasy comedy films
American comedy horror films
American supernatural horror films
American fantasy comedy films
American female buddy films
BAFTA winners (films)
Buddy comedy films
American dark fantasy films
1980s English-language films
Films scored by John Williams
Films directed by George Miller
Films based on American novels
Films based on fantasy novels
Films set in Massachusetts
Films set in Rhode Island
Films set in country houses
Films shot in Boston
Films shot in Los Angeles County, California
Films shot in Massachusetts
Kennedy Miller Mitchell films
Uxoricide in fiction
Films about witchcraft
Films produced by Peter Guber
Films produced by Jon Peters
Films with screenplays by Michael Cristofer
Warner Bros. films
1987 comedy films
Polyamory in fiction
1980s female buddy films
1980s American films